Robert Wardy is reader in Classics at the University of Cambridge, and Director of Studies in Philosophy and Classics at St Catharine's College, Cambridge.

Publications
Aristotle in China: Language, Categories And Translation
The Birth of Rhetoric: Gorgias, Plato and Their Successors
The Chain of Change: A Study of Aristotle's Physics VII
Doing Greek Philosophy

References

Philosophy academics
Year of birth missing (living people)
Living people
American classical scholars
Members of the University of Cambridge faculty of classics
American scholars of ancient Greek philosophy
Fellows of St Catharine's College, Cambridge